The Korean Peninsula Energy Development Organization (KEDO) was an organization founded on March 15, 1995, by the United States, South Korea, and Japan to implement the 1994 U.S.-North Korea Agreed Framework that froze North Korea's indigenous nuclear power plant development centered at the Yongbyon Nuclear Scientific Research Center, that was suspected of being a step in a nuclear weapons program.
KEDO's principal activity was to construct two light water reactor nuclear power plants in North Korea to replace North Korea's Magnox type reactors. The original target year for completion was 2003.

Since then, other members joined:
 1995: Australia, Canada, New Zealand
 1996: Argentina, Chile, Indonesia
 1997: European Union, Poland
 1999: Czech Republic
 2000: Uzbekistan

KEDO discussions took place at the level of a U.S. Assistant Secretary of State, South Korea's deputy foreign minister, and the head of the Asian bureau of Japan's Foreign Ministry.

The KEDO Secretariat was located in New York. KEDO was shut down in 2006.

History

Formal ground breaking on the site for two light water reactors (LWR) was on August 19, 1997, at Kumho, 30 km north of Sinpo. The Kumho site had been previously selected for two similar sized reactors that had been promised in the 1980s by the Soviet Union, before its collapse.

Soon after the Agreed Framework was signed, U.S. Congress control changed to the Republican Party, who did not support the agreement. Some Republican Senators were strongly against the agreement, regarding it as appeasement. KEDO's first director, Stephen Bosworth, later commented "The Agreed Framework was a political orphan within two weeks after its signature".

Arranging project financing was not easy, and formal invitations to bid were not issued until 1998, by which time the delays were infuriating North Korea. Significant spending on the LWR project did not commence until 2000, with "First Concrete" pouring at the construction site on August 7, 2002. Construction of both reactors was well behind the original schedule.

In the wake of the breakdown of the Agreed Framework in 2003, KEDO largely lost its function. KEDO ensured that the nuclear power plant project assets at the construction site at Kumho in North Korea and at manufacturers’ facilities around the world ($1.5 billion invested to date) were preserved and maintained. The project was reported to be about 30% complete. One reactor containment building was about 50% complete and another about 15% finished. No key equipment for the reactors had been moved to the site.

In 2005, there were reports indicating that KEDO had agreed in principle to terminate the light-water reactor project. On January 9, 2006, it was announced that the project was over and the workers would be returning to their home countries. North Korea demanded compensation and has refused to return the approximately $45 million worth of equipment left behind.

Executive Directors
 Stephen W. Bosworth, 1995–1997
 L. Desaix Anderson, 1997–2001
 Charles Kartman, 2001–2005

See also
 Division of Korea
 Six-party talks

References

External links

Agreement on Supply of a Light-Water Reactor Project to the Democratic People's Republic of Korea - KEDO, 1995

Ten Years of KEDO: What Have We Learned?, U.S. Institute of Peace, March 10, 2005
Half-forgotten project is a key in next round of 6-party talks  - JoongAng Daily, September 12, 2005
Kumho: North Korea's nuclear ghost town - Asia Times, September 24, 2005
KEDO Puts Final Nail in N.Korea Reactor Project, The Chosun Ilbo, November 23, 2005
KEDO told to leave North Korea , JoongAng Daily, December 13, 2005
N.Korea says to build light-water nuclear reactors, Reuters, December 20, 2005
An unfair burden, JoongAng Daily, December 23, 2005
What Did We Learn From KEDO?, The Stanley Foundation, November 2006
KEDO Demands $1.9 Bil. Compensation From NK, The Korea Times, January 16, 2007
A History of KEDO 1994-2006, Robert Carlin, Joel Wit, Charles Kartman, Center for International Security and Cooperation, July 18, 2012
Reflections on KEDO: Ambassador Stephen Bosworth, Joel Wit and Robert Carlin (video interview of first KEDO Director), 38 North, July 19, 2012

Organizations established in 1995
International nuclear energy organizations
International organizations based in the United States
Foreign relations of North Korea
Foreign relations of South Korea
Nuclear program of North Korea
Nuclear power in North Korea
Intergovernmental organizations established by treaty